Gabriel Quak Jun Yi (born 22 December 1990) is a Singaporean professional footballer who plays as a forward for Singapore Premier League side Hougang United and the Singapore national team.

Club career

Young Lions

Quak began his professional football career with Under-23 side Young Lions in the S.League in 2008.

Quak was one of the Young Lions players involved in an on-pitch fight with Beijing Guoan Talent players in their S.League match on 7 September 2010. He was charged by the Football Association of Singapore (FAS) for gross misconduct and bringing the game into disrepute and was banned for four months and fined S$1,000 for his part in the brawl. Quak missed the 2010 Asian Games as a result of the ban.

LionsXII
In December 2011, the FAS announced that Quak was to join the newly formed LionsXII for the 2012 Malaysia Super League. National service commitments however meant that Quak failed to make a single appearance throughout the 2012 season. He was de-registered in the mid-season transfer window.

Quak returned to the LionsXII squad for the 2013 season. He made his long-awaited debut against PKNS on 15 January. He made 15 appearances in all competitions as the Lions won the 2013 Malaysia Super League.

The left-footed Quak was switched to the right side of attack for both club and country for the 2014 season. He scored his first LionsXII goal in a 3–0 win over DRB-Hicom in the Malaysia FA Cup on 21 January. He scored his first league goal, an opener against newly promoted side PDRM FA , as Lionsxii defeated them 5-3.

On the opening day of the 2015 Malaysian Super League Season, Gabriel scored the Lionsxii's first goal of the season, helping the Lionsxii win their opening match 5-3 against PDRM FA. Similarly, in the Lionsxii's opening game in the Malaysia FA Cup, Gabriel scored the 3rd goal in a 4-0 win against minnows PB Melayu Kedah to push the Lionsxii into the Round of 16.

Geylang International
Following the dissolution of the LionsXII, Quak signed for Geylang International and scored his first goal for the Eagles in a league match against Warriors FC, ending a long goalscoring drought.

Matsumoto Yamaga trial
After Geylang International and Matsumoto Yamaga signed a MOU, Quak together with fellow winger Shawal Anuar went on a one-week trial with the J2 side. However, he was not signed by the club.

Siam Navy FC
In the upcoming Thai League 2018 season, Gabriel signs for Thai League 1 side Royal Thai Navy and fill up their ASEAN import slot. On 11 February 2018, he made his starting debut against Ubon UMT.

He started as the 1st eleven in the 1st 2 matches but was substituted at half time in both matches.

In total, he scored 4 goals and created 1 assist in 24 games for the Thai side which were relegated eventually.

Warriors FC 
Quak signed for Warriors FC for the 2019 season despite receiving lucrative offers from overseas club in order to spend more time with his young family. During the 2019 Singapore Cup, Warriors' captain Khairul Nizam was injured and Quak took over the captaincy for the competition.

Lion City Sailors FC
In 2021, Quak won the Goal of the Year for his volley goal in the 4-1 win over Balestier Khalsa in April during the FAS Awards Night.

Quak was released by Lion City Sailors on 28 November 2022. He departed after scoring 29 goals across three seasons for the Sailors, as well as a SPL Player of the Year in 2020.

International career

Youth
Gabriel Quak has played for Singapore at Under-15, Under-18 and Under-23 levels. He represented Singapore in the Lion City Cup, AFF U15 Tournament, Asian Youth Games Qualifiers, AFC U18 Qualifiers, VFF Cup and Southeast Asian Games.

Senior
Quak earned his first international cap in a friendly match against Laos on 7 June 2013, scoring a goal on his debut. His first competitive goal came in an upset win over Syria in a 2015 AFC Asian Cup qualification match on 15 October 2013.

He is the first Singapore-born Chinese player to feature regularly for the national team in 7 years since Goh Tat Chuan despite the ethnic Chinese forming the majority of the population.

Others

Singapore Selection Squad
He was selected as part of the Singapore Selection squad for The Sultan of Selangor’s Cup to be held on 6 May 2017.

Personal life

Quak was born on 22 December 1990 to Alan, a senior technical associate at a building consultancy and Juet May, an early childhood educator in 1990. He has a younger sister, Gu Ting.

Quak received his primary school education at Catholic High School and went to Guangyang Secondary School. He graduated with a diploma in Industrial and Operations Management from Republic Polytechnic.

Quak is married to Melissa Teo and they have two children.

Career statistics

Club
. Caps and goals may not be correct.

 Young Lions and LionsXII are ineligible for qualification to AFC competitions in their respective leagues.
 Young Lions withdrew from the Singapore Cup and Singapore League Cup in 2011 due to scheduled participation in the 2011 AFF U-23 Youth Championship.

International statistics

International goals
Scores and results list Singapore's goal tally first.

U22 International goals
Scores and results list Singapore's goal tally first.

U19 International goals
Scores and results list Singapore's goal tally first.

Statistics accurate as of match played 12 October 2018

Honours

Club
LionsXII
Malaysia Super League: 2013
Malaysia FA Cup: 2015

Lion City Sailors
Singapore Premier League: 2021

International
Singapore
Lion City Cup: 2006
Southeast Asian Games Bronze Medal: 2009, 2013

Individual 

 Singapore Premier League Player of the year: 2020
 Singapore Premier League Goal of the year: 2021

References

External links
 
 Tnp.sg
 Goal.com
 Goal.com
 Todayonline.com
 Fas.org.sg
 Junpiterfutbol.com
 Axrosstheline.com

1990 births
Living people
Singaporean footballers
Singapore international footballers
Singapore Premier League players
Singaporean sportspeople of Chinese descent
LionsXII players
Association football wingers
Association football inside forwards
Malaysia Super League players
Young Lions FC players
Southeast Asian Games bronze medalists for Singapore
Southeast Asian Games medalists in football
Competitors at the 2009 Southeast Asian Games
Competitors at the 2013 Southeast Asian Games
Lion City Sailors FC players